German submarine U-488 was a Type XIV supply and replenishment U-boat ("Milchkuh") of Nazi Germany's Kriegsmarine during World War II.

Its keel was laid down on 3 January 1942 by Germaniawerft in Kiel as yard number 557. It was launched on 17 October 1942 and commissioned on 1 February 1943, with Leutnant zur See Erwin Bartke in command. Bartke was promoted to Oberleutnant zur See by February 1944; he was relieved by Oblt.z.S. Bruno Studt.

The boat's service began with training under the 4th U-boat Flotilla and culminated with the 12th flotilla for operations.

Design
German Type XIV submarines were shortened versions of the Type IXDs they were based on. U-488 had a displacement of  when at the surface and  while submerged. She had two shafts and two propellers.

U-488 was not fitted with torpedo tubes or deck guns, but had two  SK C/30 anti-aircraft guns with 2500 rounds as well as a  C/30 guns with 3000 rounds. The boat had a complement of fifty-three.

Operational career
U-488 conducted three patrols. As a supply boat, it avoided combat.

First patrol
U-488s first patrol commenced when it left Kiel on 18 May 1943. It cleared the British Isles, sailing through the gap between the Faroe Islands and Iceland and out into the central Atlantic. On the return journey, it passed to the north-west of the Azores and reached Bordeaux in occupied France on 10 July 1943.

Second patrol
It was attacked on its second patrol on 12 October 1943 by two Avengers from the escort carrier . The aircraft claimed a sinking, but U-488 was able to continue its mission.

On 15 October, Maschinenmaat Karl Bergmann died of an illness. On 25 November, Matrosenobergefreiter Heinz Heinlein fell overboard. He was rescued, but died of heart failure shortly afterwards.

The U-boat returned to Bordeaux on 12 December 1943.

Third patrol and loss
The boat departed Bordeaux for the last time on 22 April 1944.

Wolfpacks
U-488 took part in one wolfpack, namely:
 Trutz (6 – 12 June 1943)

References

Bibliography

External links
 

German Type XIV submarines
U-boats commissioned in 1943
U-boats sunk in 1944
World War II submarines of Germany
1942 ships
World War II shipwrecks in the Atlantic Ocean
Ships built in Kiel
U-boats sunk by depth charges
U-boats sunk by US warships
Ships lost with all hands
Maritime incidents in April 1944